Bellanamullia or Bealnamulla is a village in County Roscommon, Ireland.

The area has experienced growth in the early 21st century, attributable to Athlone's expansion.

Although a village in its own right, Bealnamulla is considered a suburb of Athlone town for census purposes.

The Meehambee Dolmen, a Megalithic tomb, is located about one kilometre south of the village.

Notable people

 Michael Duignan, Roman Catholic prelate and current Bishop of Clonfert and Galway and Kilmacduagh, was educated in the village.

See also
 List of towns and villages in Ireland

References

Towns and villages in County Roscommon